Yenice, Polatlı is a village in the District of Polatlı, Ankara Province, Turkey.

References

Villages in Polatlı District